Marvel Super Hero Squad Online was a massively multiplayer online game for younger audiences based on the Marvel Super Hero Squad, developed by American video game companies The Amazing Society and Gazillion Entertainment. The open beta version of the game was released on April 29, 2011 (although a closed beta was released in early 2011). It was a free-to-play game that supported both microtransactions of its in-game currency and a monthly subscription.

Players collected heroes to form their own Squad. They were able to choose a hero from their Squad to play in a number of games and activities. As they played, the heroes increased not only their power in combat, but unlocked animated emotes for use in the social game world zones.

Marvel Super Hero Squad Online was the first MMO game developed in Gazillion's and Marvel's 10-year exclusive game publishing agreement. The second was Marvel Heroes.

Marvel Super Hero Squad Online was shut down on January 11, 2017. Gazillion Entertainment itself shut down on November 22, 2017.

Gameplay
Marvel Super Hero Squad Online had alternate controls, in which with one click the player could move from one place to another, or use the arrow keys or the traditional WASD keys on a keyboard. Selected characters could fly by pressing blue circles on the ground. If the character was unable to fly, that character could have a double jump or a high/long jump. Points were separated into two compartments, gold, and fractals. Both gold and fractals could be used to buy anything, the difference being that fractals could be earned over time in a game while gold had to be purchased with real money in the store. Many characters from the Marvel Universe appeared in Marvel Super Hero Squad Online in a traditional Super Hero Squad "super-deformed" style.

Missions had a beat 'em up style where players had to defeat a massive number of enemies to reach the final boss.

The game's playing area was separated into zones. These included the Daily Bugle, the Baxter Building, and Asgard which were associated with Spider-Man, the Fantastic Four, and Thor, respectively. A fourth zone named Villainville was also made available.

A collectible card game was made available to play in early August 2011. The object was to deplete one's opponent's card deck by attacking with their own cards. An arcade was developed where players could play as Deadpool, She-Hulk, Black Panther, Daredevil, Captain America, Thor, Doctor Strange and Jean Grey in selected mini-games. Two characters such as Deadpool and She-Hulk were featured in each mini-game. An achievement system was released that allowed players to complete several challenges such as greeting other players, buying new heroes, beating missions or card game quests. Each challenge completed awarded the player fractals, and a new hero. The game was released in Europe on November 4, 2011. On November 1, 2012, the European server was merged with the North American server and expanded to encompass more European countries.

References

External links
 Official International Website (archived)
 European Website (archived)
 Gazillion Website (archived)
 

Massively multiplayer online role-playing games
2011 video games
MacOS games
Windows games
Massively multiplayer online games
Digital collectible card games
Video games based on Marvel Comics
Video games developed in the United States
Inactive massively multiplayer online games
Video games scored by Adam Gubman
Superhero crossover video games